Torossian is a surname. Notable people with the surname include:

 Gariné Torossian, Armenian-Canadian filmmaker
 Krikor Torosian, Ottoman illustrator and genocide victim
 Ronn Torossian (born 1974), American public relations executive
 Sarkis Torossian (1891–1954), Ottoman army captain